Dogpatch and Dog Patch may refer to:

 Dogpatch, the setting of the comic Li'l Abner
 Dogpatch, San Francisco, California, US, a neighborhood 
 Dogpatch USA, a defunct theme park in Arkansas, US
Dogpatch, a former name of Marble Falls, Arkansas, US
Dog Patch, West Virginia, US

Other uses

See also